Samarakoon Mudiyanselage Ranjith known as S. M. Ranjith is the fifth Chief Minister of the North Central Province of Sri Lanka. He belongs to the Sri Lanka Freedom Party and part of the United People's Freedom Alliance.

References

Sri Lankan Buddhists
Chief Ministers of North Central Province, Sri Lanka
Provincial councillors of Sri Lanka
Living people
Sri Lanka Freedom Party politicians
United People's Freedom Alliance politicians
People from Anuradhapura
Sinhalese politicians
Year of birth missing (living people)